"Hold" is a song by Australian singer songwriter, Vera Blue. This was her first single under the name Vera Blue, as she'd previously released songs under her birth name, Celia Pavey. "Hold" was released on 18 September 2015 and peaked at number 62 on the Australian ARIA Chart in March 2016 and at number 5 on the US Spotify viral top 50 chart.

Upon release, Vera Blue said; “This song is about finding someone who pulls you out of a dark place. It’s about when you’ve opened your heart so many times to people and you finally find that person who is there to protect you, to look after you, even when you’ve hurt them and they’ve hurt you. You never give up on them.” 

A black and white music video was released on 19 November 2015 to promote the single. It was directed by Pete Foley & Laura Nagy.

The single was certified gold in 2017 and platinum in 2018.

Track listing 
Digital download

Remix digital download

Charts

Certifications

Release history

References 

Vera Blue songs
2015 singles
2015 songs
Universal Music Australia singles
Songs written by Vera Blue
Songs written by Gossling